Rolando Barrera (born 18 October 1960 in Entre Ríos Province) is an Argentine former football striker.

References

External links
 Rolando Barrera at BDFA.com.ar 
 La Liga profile 
 

1960 births
Living people
Argentine footballers
Argentine expatriate footballers
Association football forwards
Newell's Old Boys footballers
RCD Mallorca players
OGC Nice players
Expatriate footballers in Spain
Expatriate footballers in France
Argentine Primera División players
La Liga players
Ligue 1 players
San Lorenzo de Almagro footballers
Instituto footballers
Club Atlético Colón footballers
Argentine expatriate sportspeople in France
Argentine expatriate sportspeople in Spain
Sportspeople from Entre Ríos Province